As of March 2021, there are over 33 million wireless subscriptions in Canada. Approximately 90% of Canadian mobile phone users subscribe to one of the four largest national telecommunication companies (Rogers Wireless, Bell Mobility, Freedom Mobile and Telus Mobility) or one of their subsidiary brands. These four mobile network operators own and operate transmission facilities that cover most of the country, though they sometimes share each other's networks in certain geographical regions in order to reduce costs and reach more customers.

The remaining 10% of subscribers are served by smaller, regional providers, mobile virtual network operators (MVNOs), and resellers. Regional providers own and operate transmission facilities that cover a limited area and rely on partnerships with national service providers to connect their customers across Canada. In contrast, MVNOs and resellers do not own spectrum or network infrastructure and are required to lease network capacity from other providers at wholesale rates. While MVNOs have their own facilities to package and support their mobile services, resellers rely on the host network provider to package, market, bill, and deliver mobile services.

All wireless service providers in Canada are regulated by the Canadian Radio-television and Telecommunications Commission (CRTC), which has been blamed by some for the concentration of wireless service subscribers to only three large national carriers. Though measures have been taken to encourage more competition, critics suggest that more should be done to address the issue, e.g. by mandating wholesale network access for MVNOs.

Mobile network operators (MNOs)
This is a list of mobile network operators, which includes national and regional service providers. Where applicable, this list will also include any subsidiary "extension" brands associated with a mobile service provider. While primary brands, such as Rogers Wireless or Bell Mobility, account for roughly 82% of wireless revenue, extension brands allow wireless service providers to differentiate service offerings and reach broader market segments.

Mobile virtual network operators (MVNOs) and resellers

Former MVNOs

Defunct, merged and acquired operators 
Some operators listed below may still function as a separate brand but they no longer own any infrastructure (towers, network, etc.).

See also
 Mobile country code#Canada - CA
 List of Canadian electric utilities
 List of Canadian telephone companies
 List of telephone operating companies
 List of mobile network operators
 List of mobile network operators of the Americas#Canada
 List of United States wireless communications service providers

References

 
Mobile virtual network operators
Canadian
Mobile phone